Helena Douglas (エレナ・ダグラス Erena Dagurasu?) is a player character in the Dead or Alive series of fighting games by Team Ninja and Tecmo (Koei Tecmo). She was introduced in 1999's Dead or Alive 2 as a French opera singer and Piguaquan martial arts seeking to avenge her mother's murder. Due to her blood relation to Fame Douglas, the founder and original head of the seemingly antagonistic organization behind the Dead or Alive fighting tournaments, DOATEC, she has become a key character in the franchise, including serving as the protagonist of Dead or Alive 4.

Appearances

In video games

Helena Douglas is the illegitimate daughter of Fame Douglas and his mistress, a French soprano named Maria. Seemingly distant from her father, Helena was hardly affected by his assassination after the first Dead or Alive, and instead followed in her mother's footsteps by becoming a successful opera singer in her own right. However, she herself is targeted in an attempted hit during one of her performances, but Maria spots the assassin's sniper rifle at the last second and intentionally takes the fatal bullet intended for her daughter, leaving Helena alone and seeking vengeance.

She officially debuts in Dead or Alive 2 (1999), where, while searching for the killer, she discovers that her parents' deaths and the attempt on her own life are connected to the Dead or Alive (DOA) World Combat Championship, and enters the tournament to discover the truth. Although never explained in the series, Helena appears to have learned or known information pertaining to the Dead or Alive Tournament Executive Committee (DOATEC), especially after encountering an amnesiac contestant named Ein. Helena implicates Ayane as her mother's assassin, an accusation Ayane neither confirms nor denies, which causes a fight to break out between them.

Helena returns for Dead or Alive 3 (2001), and is captured by antagonist Victor Donovan and imprisoned. Although Helena insists that she has no ties to DOATEC, Donovan declares that her freedom and the revelation of the truth behind DOATEC—her father having been the head of the organization prior to his death—hinges on her winning the third tournament. In the meantime, Donovan assigns Christie to keep an eye on her, with orders to kill her if necessary. However, when confronted by Helena, Christie admits that she is an assassin sent to terminate her, but the attempt fails.

Helena takes over as new chairperson of DOATEC in 2005's Dead or Alive 4, in which she is the main protagonist. She hires the assassin Bayman to take out Donovan, a job he declines. When the DOATEC Tritower comes under attack by the Mugen Tenshin ninja clan, Helena meets La Mariposa, who admits she tricked the clan into attacking in order to stop Donovan. She later discovers that she and Kokoro are blood-related, as her mother Miyako had been one of Fame Douglas' mistresses. Helena is later approached by Kasumi who tells her to stop the war between DOATEC and the Mugen Tenshin. Helena refuses, stating that they'll stop at nothing until DOATEC is destroyed, and she is willing do anything to stop Donovan and Alpha-152. Helena attempts to kill Kasumi with a pistol but she is saved by Hayabusa. Helena learns the truth about Christie’s involvement of Maria’s death and they meet in battle again, the result of which is unknown, save for the fact that they both survive. Helena elects to go down with DOATEC by activating the building's self-destruct mechanism. Once the self-destruct is activated, she reflects on her childhood and the deaths of both Maria and another of her father's past lovers, Anna. As Ayane, Hayate, and Ryu Hayabusa are detonating the DOATEC headquarters, Helena elects to give up her life in the flames of the wreckage before Zack arrives in a helicopter to rescue her.

In Dead or Alive 5 (2012), Helena eventually hires Zack while proclaim him to the winner of fourth tournament. With Zack's help, she becomes the leader of the newly reformed DOATEC and announces the revival of the Dead or Alive tournaments, then enlists Hayate and Ayane to help Kasumi on the latter's mission of destroying an army of evil clones of herself, though Helena was unaware that the Kasumi she saw was actually a clone, until the real Kasumi joins the fray in the final battle.

Dead or Alive 5 Ultimate introduced Helena's loyal maid servant Marie Rose, whom Helena send her to keep an eye on a young scholar fighter who was introduced in Dead or Alive 5 Last Round named Honoka in Dead or Alive 6, realizing that MIST will kidnap her upon witnessing a familiar phenomenal power within Honoka in the day when the said young fighter was disqualified in the fifth tournament’s Asian qualifier match. As Hayate met Rig shortly at the night after the fifth tournament ended in the same time Helena set self-destruct DiG where MIST been hiding, but not in another way it seems, Helena realize something tragically happened to Rig, not even Rig aware what happened after his “home” was destroyed and begin to live at Bass Armstrong’s apartment in New York. Although Lisa manage to survive the explosion at MIST’s first hideout on DiG, Helena tried to object Lisa from keeping herself take a risk to end Donovan’s terror, but realize the latter has a point on not wasting time to let a madman like Donovan get away from his crimes. When Kokoro found out her connection with their late-biological father Fame, Helena got into an argument with her half-sister over their illegitimate family, until Zack manage to calm down the situation, much to Helena’s relieve. As Marie, Bayman and the ninjas finally found MIST’s second hideout in the same time after Honoka and Ayane’s biological evil father Raidou was revived as an undead cyber nukenin, Helena confronts the young scientist who led a resurrection project behind Raidou’s revival, NiCO, who also revived Helena’s late-mother Maria off-screen. Upon realizing what NiCO’s plan is, Helena disapproves of bringing their lost parents back to life, citing that one needs to move on and vowing that NiCO will someday learn to move on from her pain as Helena has.

Helena is playable in the spinoff games Dead or Alive Xtreme Beach Volleyball (2003), Dead or Alive Xtreme 2 (2006) and Dead or Alive Paradise (2010), still pursuing Christie. She returned as one of nine player characters in the 2016 release Dead or Alive Xtreme 3 after being voted onto the roster in a Japanese fan poll.

Design and gameplay

Helena is listed as standing 5'7" in height and 108 pounds, with long blonde hair and aqua green eyes, while her measurements are 35-22-34. Pre-order bonuses for Dead or Alive 5 Last Round offered by Amazon.com included a downloadable operatic "Showstopper" costume for the character. One of Helena's outfits in Last Round is a dress designed by manga artist Tamiki Wakaki, while others include downloadable costumes of Reina from Deception IV: The Nightmare Princess, Vita Clotilde from Nihon Falcom's The Legend of Heroes: Trails of Cold Steel, Professor Tierra from Square Enix's School Girl Strikers, and Aquarius from the manga and anime Fairy Tale, as well as a  ninja outfit and the Garrison Regiment uniform from Attack on Titan.

According to IGN, "as one of the most technical characters in" Dead or Alive 3, "Helena has a truckload of different special techniques and arguably the most powerful punch attacks in the game." The site added that  her "fluid motions make her the most graceful fighter" in the series, and in Dead or Alive Ultimate, Helena is a "great mixture of leg and fist strength" and is "not the easiest character to master, but when you do master her techniques, you'll dominate." Hardcore Gaming 101 said, "Her martial arts style, Pi Gua Quan, is not often seen in fighting games, [and] relies on long-hauling circular movements to gain momentum." Helena is an unlockable character in Dead or Alive 4, in which she has many "good 'launcher' attacks" that can lead into juggle combos, according to GameSpy.

In film

Helena is a main character in the 2006 live-action film DOA: Dead or Alive, played by Sarah Carter. Helena's role of tournament hostess remains intact, but her backstory is ignored and she is given an upbeat personality that contrasts to her aloof in-game disposition; she appears in one scene wearing roller skates, and a line of dialogue has her commenting about wanting to visit Paris. Throughout the movie, Helena is treated as a necessary annoyance by tournament organizer Donovan (Eric Roberts), who has gained control of DOATEC after the death of Helena's father. She additionally gains a noncanonical love interest in Donovan's technical assistant, Weatherby.

Reception

Helena has received mostly positive critical and public reception. Hilary Goldstein of IGN enthused in 2004, "We love Helena because she's the default ass-kicker. Plus, her home arena, the burning Opera House, is among the coolest in DOA Ultimate. Helena is also the only girl [in the series] that has classic beauty to her. The others play on that Asian school girl vibe men love, but Helena has more class (and bosom, sure) going for her ... the lack of slut outfits makes her the best dressed." The site further described Helena as "gorgeous" and a "classy French vixen". Official Dreamcast Magazine commented that Helena proved the stereotype of the "fat opera chick" to be "wildly inaccurate." GameFront included her among the top video game girls of all time in 2007. In 2014, Brazilian site GameHall's "Portal PlayGame" ranked Helena as the eleventh-most sexy female video character, deeming her the "most beautiful" overall in the series. Helena was voted the DOA series' tenth-most popular character in a fan poll conducted by Koei Tecmo in 2014, but while she was one of the characters voted by fans to qualify for Dead or Alive 3 Xtreme, she finished last (ninth) with the fewest percentage of votes.

Joystiq's Ludwig Kietzmann questioned "the practices of Helena Douglas, a supposedly French CEO who dresses for sultry cabaret and literally beats up her employees." AJ Glasser of Kotaku declared Maria the "best mom" in fighting games, "because nothing says 'Mommy loves you' like taking a sniper's bullet to the heart." However, the site included Fame Douglas among the worst fathers in video games. "Fame knocks up a world-famous opera singer and then doesn't marry her; but he does leave his daughter his effed up company, DOATEC, after being assassinated. Thanks, Daddy!" Helena was named one of the top seven "hottest girls" in video game film adaptations by Spanish magazine Marca Player in 2009. Her fight scene with Christie placed eleventh in the 2012 "best cinematic girl-on-girl fights" online poll conducted by JoBlo.com.

See also
List of Dead or Alive characters

References

External links
 (DOA5)

Fictional businesspeople in video games
Dead or Alive (franchise) characters
Female characters in video games
Fictional business executives
Fictional French people in video games
Fictional female musicians
Fictional martial artists in video games
Fictional Piguaquan practitioners
Fictional opera singers
Fictional singers
Fictional volleyball players
Koei Tecmo protagonists
Musician characters in video games
Singer characters in video games
Video game characters introduced in 1999
Woman soldier and warrior characters in video games